Rudolf Auspitz (Vienna, 7 July 1837 - Vienna, 10 March 1906) was an Austrian industrialist, economist, politician, and banker. He was the father of artist Josefine Winter (1873-1943)

In 1874, together with his cousins, the siblings Leopold, Adolf, Richard, Ida and Helene Lieben, Auspitz purchased the property Universitätsring 4 / Löwelbastei 22 / Oppoltzergasse 6, built by the Wiener Baugesellschaft,

References

1837 births
1906 deaths
Politicians from Vienna
Jewish Austrian politicians
Austro-Hungarian Jews
Constitutional Party (Austria) politicians
Members of the Austrian House of Deputies (1873–1879)
Members of the Austrian House of Deputies (1879–1885)
Members of the Austrian House of Deputies (1885–1891)
Members of the Austrian House of Deputies (1891–1897)
Members of the Austrian House of Deputies (1897–1900)
Members of the Austrian House of Deputies (1901–1907)
Members of the Moravian Diet
Austrian bankers
Austrian economists
Austrian industrialists
19th-century Austrian businesspeople
Burials at Döbling Cemetery